Slivnica is a village on the eastern shore of Lake Prespa in the Resen Municipality of the Republic of North Macedonia.

Demographics
Slivnica is inhabited by Orthodox Macedonians. During the late Ottoman period, Macedonian Muslims also used to reside in Slivnica. The statistics of Bulgarian ethnographer Vasil Kanchov from 1900 also verifies this. In his statistics Slivnica had 126 inhabitants with 120 being Bulgarian Exarchists and 6 being Bulgarian Muslims.

Slivnica has a population of 188 people. It is one of only four villages in Resen Municipality that saw a population increase from the 1994 census to the most recent one in 2002.

References

Villages in Resen Municipality